As August 2022, Flybondi operates to the following destinations:

List

Future destinations
Recife - Recife International Airport

Salvador da Bahia - Salvador International Airport

See also 

Transport in Argentina

Notes

References

External links 
  

Lists of airline destinations